Rose-Kaying Woo is a Canadian elite artistic gymnast who competed at the 2016 Olympic Games in Rio de Janeiro, Brazil. She also represented Canada at the 2014 Pacific Rim Championships where she helped the Canadian team win a silver medal.

References 

2000 births
Canadian female artistic gymnasts
Living people
Junior artistic gymnasts
People from LaSalle, Quebec
Gymnasts from Montreal
Gymnasts at the 2016 Summer Olympics
Olympic gymnasts of Canada
21st-century Canadian women